Baclofen, sold under the brand name Lioresal among others, is a medication used to treat muscle spasticity such as from a spinal cord injury or multiple sclerosis. It may also be used for hiccups and muscle spasms near the end of life. It is taken by mouth or by delivery into the spinal canal.

Common side effects include sleepiness, weakness, and dizziness. Serious side effects may occur if baclofen is rapidly stopped including seizures and rhabdomyolysis. Use in pregnancy is of unclear safety while use during breastfeeding is probably safe. It is believed to work by decreasing levels of certain neurotransmitters.

Baclofen was approved for medical use in the United States in 1977. It is available as a generic medication. In 2020, it was the 108th most commonly prescribed medication in the United States, with more than 6million prescriptions.

Medical uses

Baclofen is primarily used for the treatment of spastic movement disorders, especially in instances of spinal cord injury, cerebral palsy, and multiple sclerosis. Its use in people with stroke or Parkinson's disease is not recommended.  Intrathecal baclofen is used for severe spasticity of spinal cord origin that is refractive to maximum doses of oral antispasmodic agents or who experience intolerable side effects.

Adverse drug reactions
Adverse effects include drowsiness, dizziness, weakness, fatigue, headache, trouble sleeping, nausea and vomiting, urinary retention, or constipation.

Withdrawal syndrome
Discontinuation of baclofen can be associated with a withdrawal syndrome which resembles benzodiazepine withdrawal and alcohol withdrawal. Withdrawal symptoms are more likely if baclofen is administered intrathecally or for long periods of time (more than a couple of months) and can occur from low or high doses. The severity of baclofen withdrawal depends on the rate at which it is discontinued. Thus to minimise withdrawal symptoms, the dose should be tapered down slowly when discontinuing baclofen therapy. Abrupt withdrawal is more likely to result in severe withdrawal symptoms. Acute withdrawal symptoms can be eased or completely reversed by re-initiating therapy with baclofen.

Withdrawal symptoms may include auditory hallucinations, visual hallucinations, tactile hallucinations, delusions, confusion, agitation, delirium, disorientation, fluctuation of consciousness, insomnia, dizziness, nausea, inattention, memory impairments, perceptual disturbances, itching, anxiety, depersonalization, hypertonia, hyperthermia (higher than normal temperature without infection), formal thought disorder, psychosis, mania, mood disturbances, restlessness, and behavioral disturbances, tachycardia, seizures, tremors, autonomic dysfunction, hyperpyrexia (fever), extreme muscle rigidity resembling neuroleptic malignant syndrome and rebound spasticity.

Abuse

Baclofen, at standard dosing, does not appear to possess addictive properties, and has not been associated with any degree of drug craving. Euphoria is however listed as a common to very common side-effect of baclofen in the   BNF 75 There are very few cases of abuse of baclofen for reasons other than attempted suicide. In contrast to baclofen, another GABAB receptor agonist, γ-hydroxybutyric acid (GHB), has been associated with euphoria, abuse, and addiction. These effects are likely mediated not by activation of the GABAB receptor, but rather by activation of the GHB receptor. Baclofen possesses both sedative and anxiolytic properties.

Overdose
Reports of overdose indicate that baclofen may cause symptoms including vomiting, general weakness, sedation, respiratory insufficiency, seizures, unusual pupil size, dizziness, headaches, itching, hypothermia, bradycardia, hypertension, hyporeflexia and coma sometimes mimicking brain death.

Pharmacology
Chemically, baclofen is a derivative of the neurotransmitter γ-aminobutyric acid (GABA). It is believed to work by activating (or agonizing) GABA receptors, specifically the GABAB receptors. Its beneficial effects in spasticity result from its actions in the brain and spinal cord.

Pharmacodynamics
Baclofen produces its effects by activating the GABAB receptor, similar to the drug phenibut which also activates this receptor and shares some of its effects. Baclofen is postulated to block mono-and-polysynaptic reflexes by acting as an inhibitory ligand, inhibiting the release of excitatory neurotransmitters. However, baclofen does not have significant affinity for the GHB receptor, and has no known abuse potential. The modulation of the GABAB receptor is what produces baclofen's range of therapeutic properties.

Similarly to phenibut (β-phenyl-GABA), as well as pregabalin (β-isobutyl-GABA), which are close analogues of baclofen, baclofen (β-(4-chlorophenyl)-GABA) has been found to block α2δ subunit-containing voltage-gated calcium channels (VGCCs). However, it is weaker relative to phenibut in this action (Ki = 23 and 39 μM for R- and S-phenibut and 156 μM for baclofen). Moreover, baclofen is in the range of 100-fold more potent by weight as an agonist of the GABAB receptor in comparison to phenibut, and in accordance, is used at far lower relative dosages. As such, the actions of baclofen on α2δ subunit-containing VGCCs are likely not clinically relevant.

Pharmacokinetics
The drug is rapidly absorbed after oral administration and is widely distributed throughout the body. Biotransformation is low: the drug is predominantly excreted unchanged by the kidneys. The half-life of baclofen is roughly 2–4 hours; it therefore needs to be administered frequently throughout the day to control spasticity appropriately.

Chemistry
Baclofen is a white (or off-white) mostly odorless crystalline powder, with a molecular weight of 213.66 g/mol. It is slightly soluble in water, very slightly soluble in methanol, and insoluble in chloroform.

History
Historically, baclofen was designed as a drug for treating epilepsy. It was first made at Ciba-Geigy, by the Swiss chemist Heinrich Keberle, in 1962. Its effect on epilepsy was disappointing, but it was found that in certain people, spasticity decreased. In 1971, it was introduced as a treatment for certain form of spasticity. It approved by the US Food and Drug Administration (FDA) in 1977.

Currently, baclofen continues to be given by mouth, with variable effects. In severely affected children, the oral dose is so high that side-effects appear, and the treatment loses its benefit.

Intrathecal baclofen was first introduced in 1984 to treat severe spinal spasticity. This administration route aimed to avoid supraspinal side effects.

In his 2008 book, Le Dernier Verre (translated literally as The Last Glass or The End of my Addiction), French-American cardiologist Olivier Ameisen described how he treated his alcoholism with baclofen. Inspired by this book, an anonymous donor gave $750,000 to the University of Amsterdam in the Netherlands to initiate a clinical trial of high-dose baclofen, which Ameisen had called for since 2004. The trial concluded, "In summary, the current study did not find evidence of a positive effect of either low or high doses of baclofen in AD patients. However, we cannot exclude the possibility that baclofen is an effective medication for the treatment of severe, heavy drinking AD patients not responding to or not accepting routine psychosocial interventions."

Society and culture

Routes of administration

Baclofen can be administered transdermally as part of a pain-relieving and muscle-relaxing topical cream mix at a compounding pharmacy, orally or intrathecally (directly into the cerebral spinal fluid) using a pump implanted under the skin.

Intrathecal pumps offer much lower doses of baclofen because they are designed to deliver the medication directly to the spinal fluid rather than going through the digestive and blood system first. A drug concentration in the cerebrospinal fluid more than 10 times greater than when given orally is achieved with this route versus. At the same time the blood concentration levels are almost undetectable, thus minimizing side effects.

Besides those with spasticity, intrathecal administration is also used in patients with cerebral palsy or multiple sclerosis who have severe painful spasms which are not controllable by oral baclofen. With pump administration, a test dose is first injected into the spinal fluid to assess the effect, and if successful in relieving spasticity, a chronic intrathecal catheter is inserted from the spine through the abdomen and attached to the pump which is implanted under the abdomen's skin, usually by the ribcage. The pump is computer-controlled for automatic dosage and its reservoir can be replenished by percutaneous injection. The pump also has to be replaced every five years or so when the battery is changed.

Other names

Synonyms include chlorophenibut.  Brand names include Beklo, Baclodol, Flexibac, Gablofen, Kemstro, Liofen, Lioresal, Lyflex, Clofen, Muslofen, Bacloren, Baklofen, Sclerofen, Pacifen and others.

Research
Baclofen is being studied for the treatment of alcoholism. Evidence as of 2019 is not conclusive enough to recommend its use for this purpose. In 2014, the French drug agency ANSM issued a 3-year temporary recommendation allowing the use of baclofen in alcoholism. In 2018, baclofen received a Marketing Authorization for use in alcoholism treatment from the agency if all other treatments are not effective.

It is being studied along with naltrexone and sorbitol for Charcot-Marie-Tooth disease (CMT), a hereditary disease that causes peripheral neuropathy. It is also being studied for cocaine addiction. Baclofen and other muscle relaxants are being studied for potential use for persistent hiccups.

From 2014 to 2017 baclofen misuse, toxicity and use in suicide attempts among adults in the US increased.

References

External links 
 

Wikipedia medicine articles ready to translate
Amines
Calcium channel blockers
Carboxylic acids
Novartis brands
Chlorobenzenes
GABA analogues
GABAB receptor agonists